If Beale Street Could Talk (Original Motion Picture Score) is the score album to the 2018 film of the same name directed by Barry Jenkins based on James Baldwin's 1974 novel of the same name. Featuring original music written and composed by Nicholas Britell, the film marked his second collaboration with Jenkins after the Academy Award-winning Moonlight (2016). According to Britell, he used two different soundscapes to depict the relationship between Clementine "Tish" Rivers (KiKi Layne) and Alonzo "Fonny" Hunt (Stephan James) as well as the horrors of alleged accusation over Fonny, and the aftermath surrounds. The primary instruments used in most of the scores, were strings and brass to depict the relationship, while orchestra and jazz also accompany the score.

The score album was released on November 9, 2018, by Lakeshore Records and received positive response from critics, praising the instrumentation, composition and musical soundscape. Britell received the Academy Award nomination for Best Original Score and BAFTA Award for Best Original Music, losing the respective awards to Ludwig Göransson's score for Black Panther and Bradley Cooper, Lady Gaga, and Lukas Nelson for A Star Is Born. However, Britell received the Black Reel Award for  Outstanding Score, and was similarly successful at critics' award ceremonies, The album was issued in double vinyl by Lakeshore Records and Invada Records on March 15, 2019.

Composition 
The score is a combination of brass, strings and orchestra. When the music for the film was first written, Jenkins said that he wanted the sounds of brass and horns, that was the "first intuitive idea of a feeling". Later, he assembled the sounds of trumpet, flügelhorn, cornet and French horns, and mixed it for the first piece he had written. But felt that the score missed strings in the musical landscape, as for Britell, the strings became like a "musical exploration or expression of love" adding that "What’s remarkable about the way Jenkins made the film is that it explores so many different kinds of love. It explores the love of parents for their children, it explores romantic love, it explores this divine, pure kind of love that exists between people. The strings came to symbolize that for us in a lot of ways."

Britell felt that he could chop and screw classical music like he did the same for hip hop in the score of Moonlight (2016). He had the strings and brass were included to write the score in a classical way, but at times, jazz harmonies as included in the score, as "music is incredibly fluid space, and sometimes the labels create boundaries that aren’t really there", thereby enticing to blend multiple genres in several ways, to create an atmospheric sounding. While composing the score, he had explained about the tuning and mixing of the score, saying: "There are few key cues where the cornet is muted. I find it totally fascinating how subtle changes in the way an instrument is played—putting a mute on an instrument, or taking it off—can completely change the things that it associates to, in your mind and in your ear. When I hear that muted cornet, that to me sounds very much like mid-century jazz, right away. At the same time, I was exploring these colors with a mixture of French horn, and trumpet and flugelhorn, even [with regard to] where they sit in the register. If you put certain instruments above others in the way that they’re layered, you’re painting with different colors, and there’s this infinite palette of possibilities. I love having the opportunity to explore these colors because each film is a different kind of creative adventure where you get to learn about different sounds."

Track listing

Reception 
James Southall of Movie Wave wrote "Virtually throughout there is this very yearning, affectionate quality to it – the film is after all ultimately a love story, albeit not one without real challenge – and it has a very personal, moving quality. It’s not sweeping romance in the John Barry sense – it’s much smaller-scale in terms of the orchestral forces, most obviously – and while you could say it’s somewhat repetitive on the album, the darker moments do provide the offset that is so often so powerful in strengthening the impact of the emotional material. There is a clarity to the orchestration (even if it is not entirely conventional) and also the performance and recording which gives the album a certain raw directness which is very impressive." Jonathan Broxton had a mixed opinion on the score, saying that "parts of the score appealing on a number of levels. But there is still an inexplicable something about the score which keeps It from clicking, whether it’s the repetitiveness, or the lack of development, or the way in which so many of the musical ideas seem to clash, to the emotional detriment of the whole experience." It has been complimented by film critics as "one of the best scores of 2018" by publications such as IndieWire, Vulture, and Film School Rejects along with Britell's Vice.

Accolades

References 

2018 soundtrack albums
Lakeshore Records soundtracks